Mellösa Church is a church building in Mellösa parish in Flen, Södermanland County, Sweden.

The church building 
The church was built in the 13th century and the latest change exterior was made in 1874, when the tower was built. The baptismal font, which is from the 12th century, is the oldest object in the church. According to Mellösa in Sörmlandsleden so the church received its location where two oxen had dragged a log and finally lay down.

References 

13th-century churches in Sweden
Churches in Södermanland County
Churches in the Diocese of Strängnäs